Cheshmeh Sorkheh (also Romanized as Cheshmeh Sorkh; also known as Cheshmeh Sorkheh-ye Dārā’ī) is a village in Koregah-e Sharqi Rural District, in the Central District of Khorramabad County, Lorestan Province, Iran. At the 2006 census, its population was 369, in 77 families.

References 

Towns and villages in Khorramabad County